The United Pointsmen and Signalmen's Society was a union representing railway workers in the United Kingdom.

The union was founded in 1880 in Bolton, when it was known as the Pointsmen's Mutual Aid and Sick Society.  Initially very small, it had only 113 members by 1881, but then grew steadily, reaching 1,437 members by 1900, and around 4,000 by 1913.  That year, it merged with the General Railway Workers' Union and the Amalgamated Society of Railway Servants to form the National Union of Railwaymen (NUR).

The union participated in the National Railway strike of 1911.  At the time, its general secretary was Samuel Chorlton, who later became an assistant general secretary of the NUR.

References

Defunct trade unions of the United Kingdom
Railway unions in the United Kingdom
1880 establishments in the United Kingdom
Trade unions established in 1880
National Union of Railwaymen
1913 disestablishments in the United Kingdom
Trade unions disestablished in 1913
Trade unions based in Greater Manchester